The William & Mary Tribe women's soccer team represents the College of William & Mary in NCAA Division I college soccer. The team belongs to the Colonial Athletic Association and plays home games at Albert-Daly Field. The Tribe are currently led by Julie Cunningham Shackford, who has coached since 2018

Through the 2016 season, the Tribe recorded 36 consecutive winning seasons (in 2017, the streak was broken when the team finished 8–10–2). This is the second longest streak in NCAA history behind only North Carolina. They also hold two NCAA single season records, both of which occurred in 2005: Most ties (9) and most overtime games (11). Their 25 all-time NCAA tournament appearances rank fourth behind only perennial powers North Carolina (33 appearances), Connecticut (29), and Virginia (27).

NCAA tournament results
William & Mary has made 25 appearances in the NCAA Division I Women's Soccer Championship. They have a combined record of 11–23–3.

Notable alumnae
 Caroline Casey (2012–2015)
 Ann Cook (1993–1997)
 Erica Dambach (1993–1996)
 Jill Ellis (1984–1987)
 Megan McCarthy (1984–1987)

See also
William & Mary Tribe men's soccer

References
William & Mary Tribe women's soccer. 2009 Media Guide. Retrieved on 30 September 2009. 
William and Mary Tribe Women's Soccer National Honors and Awards. Retrieved on 20 August 2011.

External links
Official website
The College of William & Mary

 
Association football clubs established in 1981
Soccer clubs in Virginia
1981 establishments in Virginia
Soccer clubs in Hampton Roads
NCAA Division I women's soccer teams